Pike County is the name of ten counties in the United States:

 Pike County, Alabama 
 Pike County, Arkansas 
 Pike County, Georgia
 Pike County, Illinois 
 Pike County, Indiana 
 Pike County, Kentucky 
 Pike County, Mississippi 
 Pike County, Missouri 
 Pike County, Ohio 
 Pike County, Pennsylvania

All were named to honor Zebulon Pike.